
Severn Bridge may refer to:

Bridges

Australia
 Severn River railway bridge, Dundee, over the Severn River at Dundee in New South Wales

United Kingdom
 Severn Bridge, the first road bridge over the Severn Estuary between England and Wales
 Second Severn Crossing, over the Severn Estuary between England and Wales
 Severn Railway Bridge, over the Severn Estuary in England

United States
 Severn River Bridge, also known as Pearl Harbor Memorial Bridge, over the Severn River in Maryland
 Naval Academy Bridge, over the Severn River in Maryland

Other uses
 Severn Bridge, Ontario, a community in Ontario, Canada
 Severn Bridge railway station, Gloucestershire, England

See also
 List of crossings of the River Severn
 Seven Bridges (disambiguation)